Roberto Muñoz (born 14 October 1955) is a Chilean former cyclist. He competed in the individual road race and the points race events at the 1984 Summer Olympics.

References

External links
 

1955 births
Living people
Chilean male cyclists
Olympic cyclists of Chile
Cyclists at the 1984 Summer Olympics
Place of birth missing (living people)
Pan American Games medalists in cycling
Pan American Games gold medalists for Chile
Cyclists at the 1979 Pan American Games
20th-century Chilean people
21st-century Chilean people